Kelly, Wisconsin may refer to:
Kelly, Wisconsin, a town in Bayfield County
Kelly, Juneau County, Wisconsin, an unincorporated community
Kelly, a neighborhood of Weston, Wisconsin